Beacon Island is a small uninhabited island in Ungava Bay, Qikiqtaaluk Region, Nunavut, Canada. It lies just off Cape Naujaat, on the west side of the mouth of the George River, Quebec.

See also
 Anguttuaq, formerly Beacon Island
 Beacon Island (Hudson Strait)
 Upajjana, formerly Beacon Island

References

Islands of Baffin Island
Islands of Hudson Strait
Uninhabited islands of Qikiqtaaluk Region